Dependent designation (from ;) is an important doctrine of Madhyamika Buddhism.

The term was coined (or appeared to be coined) by Nagarjuna in 24:18 of the Mūlamadhyamakakārikā. It became important for, and was championed by, the Tibetan followers of Candrakirti.

Dependent designation is one of the 'three dependencies' asserted by the Madhyamikas, the others being dependent arising, which relates to the concept that all existents arise from causes; and dependence upon parts, the idea that all existents are composite. Each of these dependencies are used, separately and together, to help establish an understanding of sunyata, the absence of inherent existence, which is connected to anatta (no-self), the third of the three marks of existence.

According to the 14th Dalai Lama,

References

Madhyamaka
Buddhist philosophical concepts
Chinese philosophy
Indian philosophy